The FN MAG is a Belgian 7.62 mm general-purpose machine gun, designed in the early 1950s at Fabrique Nationale (FN) by Ernest Vervier. It has been used by more than 80 countries and it has been made under licence in several countries, including Argentina, Canada (as the C6 GPMG), Egypt, India and the United Kingdom.

The weapon's name is an abbreviation for Mitrailleuse d'Appui Général, meaning "general support machine gun". The MAG is available in three primary versions: the standard, infantry Model 60-20 machine gun, the Model 60-40 coaxial machine gun for armoured fighting vehicles and the Model 60-30 aircraft variant.

History 
The FN MAG was designed by FN Herstal in the 1950s. Taking inspiration from the MG 42, the MAG was created firstly to help balance out inconsistent levels of firepower among pre-existing infantry arms, and secondarily in response to NATO standardisation of the 7.62×51mm round in 1954, with the machine gun serving as a complement to the FN FAL battle rifle. The MAG first entered production in 1958, and it is sometimes referred to as the MAG-58.

Design details

The MAG Model 60-20 is an automatic, air-cooled, gas-operated machine gun, firing belt-fed 7.62×51mm NATO from an open bolt. The MAG uses a series of proven design concepts from other successful firearms, for example the locking mechanism is modeled on that of the Browning M1918 (BAR) automatic rifle, which FN produced under license with some adaptions, and the feed and trigger mechanisms are from the WW II-era MG 42 universal machine gun.

Operating mechanism

The MAG operates via a long-stroke piston system, which utilizes the ignited powder gases generated by firing vented through a port in the barrel to propel a gas piston rod connected to the locking assembly. The barrel breech is locked with a vertically tilting, downward locking lever mechanism that is connected to the bolt carrier through an articulated joint. The locking shoulder and camming surfaces that guide the locking lever are located at the base of the receiver. The unlocking sequence starts after  rearward gas piston rod movement to keep the breech block fully locked until the bullet has left the gun barrel and the high-pressure propellant gas pressure has dropped to a safe level.

The MAG fires from an open bolt. Both the spring-powered extractor and ejector are contained in the bolt. After firing, spent cartridge casings are removed downwards through an ejection port normally covered by a spring-loaded dust cover at the bottom of the receiver. The machine gun has a striker firing mechanism (the bolt carrier acts as the striker as it contains a channel that houses the firing pin, which protrudes out from the surface of the bolt upon firing), an automatic-only trigger assembly and a manual cross-bolt push-button safety, which is located above the pistol grip.

Features
The MAG's receiver is constructed from sheet metal stampings reinforced by steel plates and rivets. The front is reinforced to accept the barrel nut and gas cylinder which are permanently mounted. Guide rails that support the bolt assembly and piston extension during their reciprocating movement are riveted to the side plates. The bolt's guide rails are shaped downward to drive the locking lever into engagement with the locking shoulder, which is also riveted to the side plates. The rear of the receiver has been reinforced and slotted to accept the butt stock. The MAG is also equipped with a fixed wooden stock (later production models feature polymer furniture), pistol grip, and carrying handle.

A user-adjustable gas valve allows regulating the cyclic rate of fire from 650 up to 1,000 rounds per minute, and subsidiary can adjust the gas system for various types of cartridge loadings or use in the presence of heavy fouling. A high cyclic rate of fire is advantageous for use against targets that are exposed to a general-purpose machine gun for a limited time span, like aircraft or targets that minimize their exposure time by quickly moving from cover to cover. For targets that can be fired on by a general-purpose machine gun for longer periods than just a few seconds, the cyclic firing rate becomes less important.

Barrel
The quick-change barrel has a slotted flash suppressor. The barrel's chamber and bore are chrome-lined or stellite-lined for increased service life and the barrel has four right-hand grooves with a 305 mm (1:12 in) rifling twist rate. Also attached to the barrel is the front sight base, carry handle and gas block (equipped with an exhaust-type gas regulator valve with three settings). The MAG takes zero shifts between barrel assemblies into account by making the front sight of the assemblies adjustable with the help of tools.

Feeding

The weapon feeds from the left side from open-link, metal ammunition belts: either the American disintegrating M13 linked belt (NATO standard) or the non-disintegrating segmented German DM1 belt, whose 50-round sections can be linked through a cartridge. The DM1 belt is based on the last version of the Gurt 34/41-family used in World War II in MG 34 and MG 42 machine guns. After firing, the separated M13 link or emptied DM1 belt section is cleared out on the right side of the receiver through an ejection port normally covered by a spring-loaded dust cover. In order to adapt the weapon to feed from one belt type to the other, several components of the feed mechanism need to be reconfigured since the position of the feed tray's cartridge stop and pawl angles in the top cover are different. The MAG features a pawl-type feeding mechanism that continues to move the feed link during both the rearward and forward cycles of the reciprocating bolt carrier, producing a smooth belt flow. The feeding mechanism's three pawls are actuated by a roller connected to the bolt carrier. The feed channel rail, feed link, both feed slides and the feed tray are chrome plated. The top cover body is an anodized aluminum casting. In the infantry assault role, the weapon can be fitted with a sheet metal container that houses a 50-round belt and is attached to the left side of the receiver.

Sights

The rear sight is hinged to a base with protective ears that is integral with the receiver's upper forging. The iron sight line has a  sight radius.

The top of later production model receivers often feature a MIL-STD-1913 rail as a mounting platform for firearm accessories like (low light) optical sights and night-vision devices.

Safety
With the safety placed in the safe setting, the sear mechanism is disabled. The safety can only be engaged with the weapon cocked.

Bipod and tripod
For the light machine gun fire support role, the gun is fitted with a folding bipod (attached to the end of the gas cylinder) that can be adjusted for height. For carrying or use as a forearm, the aluminum legs can be folded back and secured in slots under the receiver by hooks and a spring-loaded catch. When firing from the hip, the bipod legs remain extended and the left leg is gripped for support. The bipod can be removed from the gas cylinder by tapping-out a roll pin in the gas cylinder head until it is flush and the bipod can be rotated enough to clear the gas cylinder's retaining lugs.

Variants

Variants of the FN MAG were manufactured by at least ten companies: FN Herstal, Fabricaciones Militares, Changfeng Machinery, Indian Ordnance Factories, Carl Gustaf Stads Gevärfaktori, the Ordnance Development and Engineering Company of Singapore, Canadian Arsenals Limited, the Royal Small Arms Factory, Heckler and Koch, Manroy Engineering, Yunnan Xiyi Industry Company Limited, and Egypt's Maadi Company for Engineering Industries.

FN production variants

The vehicle-mounted variant of the MAG lacks a stock, bipod, carry handle, pistol grip, ejection port dust cover and a mount for optical sights. It does, however, have a new closed-type gas regulator. Depending on the weapon's employment, the machine gun can also be fitted with an extended charging handle linkage, standard trigger group (with a pistol grip), or a specialized trigger assembly with an electrically fired trigger.

The pintle-mounted aircraft model is fed from either the right- or left-hand side exclusively with the M13 belt. Thus configured, weapons typically lack standard iron sights and are equipped with electrically powered triggers.

British versions

The L7 general-purpose machine gun is used by the British Army. The L7 and the related L8 are license-built derivatives of the MAG. The official British Army designation for the current version is the L7A2 GPMG (General Purpose Machine Gun).

The L7 was adopted by the British forces as a replacement for the long-serving Vickers machine gun (in the medium role) and the Bren (in the light assault role), following trials in 1957. Built under license originally by Royal Small Arms Factory, Enfield Lock and currently by Manroy Engineering, it serves in the British Army, the Royal Marines and other services. There have been two main variants, the L7A1 and L7A2, developed for infantry use, with the L7A2 having superseded the earlier variant. Several other variants have been developed, notably the L8 (produced in the L8A1 and L8A2 versions), modified for mounting inside armoured vehicles (the L37 variant was developed for mounting on armoured vehicles). Although intended to replace the Bren entirely, that light machine gun (re-chambered for 7.62x51mm NATO and re-titled as the L4) continued in use in jungle terrain (especially in the Far East), where there was no requirement for the medium machine gun role, and with secondary units, until the adoption of the L86A1 Light Support Weapon (LSW). The LSW was intended to replace both the L7 and the L4 in the light machine gun role, but dissatisfaction with the L86's sustained fire capabilities and reliability resulted in combat units continuing to utilize the L7 whenever possible (although neither it, nor its 7.62×51mm NATO ammunition was supposed to be issued to infantry platoons). The British Army and Royal Marines were issued with the L110A2 (FN Minimi Para) to replace the LSW as the light section support or fire support weapon. This uses the same NATO-standard 5.56×45mm ammunition as the L85 assault rifle. However a review of requirements led to the withdrawal of both the L110A2 LMG and L86A2 LSW from service in 2018, with the 7.62 mm L7A2 resuming its place in the British Army infantry section. Other variants continue to be used in mounted roles on many British military vehicles, naval vessels and aircraft.

In 1961, the Royal Small Arms Factory, Enfield (now BAE Systems) in the United Kingdom, undertook licence production of the MAG in the following versions: L7A2, L8A2, L37A2, L20A1 and the L43A1. These models all use the M13 ammunition belt.

The L7A2, general-purpose machine gun, replaced the L7A1 in service with the British Army. Compared to the MAG Model 60-20, it features, among other minor changes, an improved feed mechanism, a 10-position gas regulator valve, a polymer butt-stock, a provision for 50 round belt-box and a bracket, used to mount optical day- and night-vision sights, mounted to the left side of the receiver. In the sustained fire role, the L7A2 can be mounted on the L4A1 tripod in conjunction with a C2A2 Support Weapons Sight or the sight unit used on the FGM-148 Javelin anti-tank missile system. The indirect firing method exploits the 7.62×51mm NATO useful maximum range, that is defined by the maximum range of a small-arms projectile while still maintaining the minimum kinetic energy required to put unprotected personnel out of action, which is generally believed to be 15 kilogram-meters (147 J / 108 ft⋅lbf). The average  elevation of  Afghanistan and accompanying low ISA air density significantly contribute to extending the useful maximum range of small-arms projectiles.

The L8A2 coaxial tank machine gun (replaced the L8A1) has a different gas valve switch (closed, single-position) when compared to the analogous Model 60-40, a different flash hider and a modified cocking handle. The weapon also has a trigger group that accepts electrical input and a lever in the feed tray that enables the belt to be removed without lifting the feed tray cover.

Another tank machine gun is the L37A2 (succeeded the L37A1) designed to be mounted on tank turrets, in the commander's position, on wheeled armoured vehicles and on armored personnel carriers. It differs from the L8A2 primarily in its trigger, which was adapted from the L7A2 GPMG. The machine gun can be used in the ground role for self-defense, by dismounted vehicle crew members, the egress kit consists of an L7A2 barrel, bipod and buttstock.

The L20A1 aircraft machine gun was based on the L8A2, from which it differs by having an electrical trigger and a slotted flash suppressor. The L20A1 can be converted to right-hand feed by changing several components in the feed mechanism.

The L43A1, also developed from the L8A2, is a coaxially mounted tank machine gun used to sight-in the vehicle's main gun by firing ballistically-matched tracer ammunition at the target to confirm the trajectory visually. The weapon's barrel, fitted with a flash hider, has a reinforced and heavier structure that increases the weapon's accuracy especially during sustained fire.'

China
An unlicensed version is made for export by Norinco and made by Changfeng Machinery Co., Ltd as the CQ, 7.62 × 51 (Copy Version) (Now renamed CS/LM1 as of 2006) with an adjustable butt. The weapon was officially produced in 2006 and it was showcased in various foreign military expo conventions.

The XY, 7.62 × 51 is a true copy of the FN MAG made with a wooden stock by Yunnan Xiyi Industry Company Limited.

German versions
The German arms manufacturer, Heckler & Koch, whose 1999 to 2002 owner BAE Systems — as the result of a 1999 merger between British Aerospace and Marconi Electronic Systems, Heckler & Koch was owned by the resulting BAE Systems — had executed a midlife improvement program of the L7A1 (FN MAG 60.20 T3) to the upgraded L7A2 (FN MAG 60.20 T6) version under contract for the British Ministry of Defence, attempted to make their own variant of the FN MAG. It was designated the HK 221. This version is equipped with an iron sight line that consist of a rotary rear drum and hooded front post and Picatinny rail atop the receiver and was meant to compete in the machine guns trials held by the German and French military between 2007-2008. The trials concluded with the French military selecting the original FN MAG in 2010, while the German military selected the Heckler & Koch MG5 in 2015.

Indonesian versions 

Indonesian arms manufacturer PT Pindad license produced FN MAG in 2003 as SM2. SM2 V1 variant comes with integrated bipod, with a total length of 1275 mm and a weight of 11.6 kg (including stock and bipod). The second variant is called SM2 V2 which is modified as a coaxial gun. The stock is removed by changing the trigger mechanism to the rear of the weapon as in the M2 Browning. This variant has a higher rate of fire of 700-1200 rpm. It is shorter at only 1070 mm in length with a weight (plus coaxial) of 12 kg.

Israeli remote control variant 
In 2020, Iranian nuclear scientist Mohsen Fakhrizadeh was killed by Mossad with an FN MAG, redesigned to fire from a remote control. The modified MAG was powered by artificial intelligence, and weighed over a ton.

Swedish Army versions

All versions are licence-manufactured by FFV-Carl Gustaf.
The Swedish abbreviation for kulspruta (machine gun, lit. "bullet sprayer") is Ksp. Strv is the abbreviation of Stridsvagn (battle tank).

Kulspruta 58: Ksp 58, adopted in 1958 using the 6.5×55mm rifle cartridge which at that time was the standard cartridge in the Swedish Army.

Kulspruta 58 B: In the early 1970s, the weapon was modified with a new gas regulator and at the same time the barrels were replaced to the new standard 7.62×51mm NATO, same as used by the Ak 4. Ksp 58 replaced the considerably heavier Ksp m/42B in the infantry units. It can be fed with non-disintegrating DM1 or disintegrating M13 linked ammunition belts.

Kulspruta 58 C: On Combat Vehicle 90, this version replaced the previously used Ksp m/39 in the third quarter of 2004.

Kulspruta 58 Strv: stripped variant mainly used for fixed mounting in tanks. Phased out along with Stridsvagn 103.

Kulspruta 58 D: Reserved designation for the renovated and modified Ksp 58B. The trial version is referred to as 'Ksp 58 DF', where the 'F' stands for 'Försök' (Experimental).
Some of the modifications:
 A MIL-STD 1913 Picatinny rail system added. Half of the weapons feature an adjustable rail - the others a fixed.
 Red dot sight (Aimpoint CompCS).
 The carrying handle is shortened to half its original length. This was necessary in order to fit an extended rail for sight systems.
 Cbuttstock butt stock or folding stock.
 100 mm shorter barrel.
 Better and shorter flash hider to reduce the length of the weapon and to produce a smaller muzzle flash, which means less disruption to the user's night vision.
 Fluted barrel in order to reduce the weight and better dissipate the heat of the barrel.
 Gas regulator has only 4 settings (instead of 8). The last position is painted red and is intended for emergency use.
 Larger 100-round ammunition pouches replaced 50-round pouches.
 New ammunition cases.
 New equipment bags.
 Bi-pod is painted green.
 There is a sheet for protection / one side green other side white / summer & winter camouflage.
 The weight of the MG is the same, but the entire system is 3 kg (6.5 lbs) lighter.

US Army versions

On January 14, 1977, the US Army awarded a contract to FN Herstal for the delivery of a modernized Model 60-40 variant tank machine gun designated the M240. Initially, the firearms were produced in Belgium. Currently they are manufactured in the US by FN's US wholly owned subsidiary FNMI (FN Manufacturing Inc.) located in Columbia, South Carolina, and by U.S. Ordnance in McCarran, Nevada.

The M240 is built in several versions:
 M240 standard coaxial machine gun used in US armored vehicles. It is used in the M60 series of tanks (where it replaced the M73/M219 7.62 mm machine guns) and the M1 Abrams family. It has an electrically operated trigger and a reloading lever. Compared to the MAG Model 60-40, the M240 has a different flash hider and gas valve.
 M240B is a modernized derivative of the M240G, which features a perforated hand-guard and heat shroud, a MIL-STD-1913 rail integral with the receiver top cover, which enables the use of optical day and night sights, a new synthetic stock and a new ammunition container. It was selected to be the U.S. Army's new medium machine gun on December 1, 1995, replacing the M60 machine gun - it defeated the M60E4 during trials. M240Bs are also replacing M240Gs in USMC service. The rate of fire is 650–750 rounds/min.
 M240C with a right-hand feed system. It is used in the M2 and M3 Bradley series of infantry fighting vehicles as a coaxial gun to the main armament.
 M240D an upgrade of the M240E1 and is optimized for use in military helicopters in a pintle-mounted configuration. The M240D is also supplied with an egress kit for dismounted use.
 M240E1 installed since 1987 on LAV-series wheeled armored fighting vehicles, has a spade-type grip with an integral trigger and cocking mechanism.
 M240G introduced into service with the United States Marine Corps and the 75th Ranger Regiment in the mid 1990s in place of the M60E3. The M240G is used on the M122A1 tripod for stationary use, and is also used in vehicular and aircraft mounts.
 M240H an improved version of the M240D. The M240H features a rail-equipped feed cover, an improved flash suppressor and has been configured so it can be more quickly converted to infantry standard using an Egress Kit.
The weight savings on the M240L are achieved by incorporating titanium and by using alternative fabricating methods for major components. A short barrel and collapsible stock are available.

Turkey
MKEK has announced that a licensed version of MAG called PMT-76 or MFY-71 will be made under the National Machinegun Project. 12 prototypes of PMT-76 were tested in 2017 and order of undisclosed number was put. 
Current specifications are:
Barrel: 547 mm
Rate of fire: 600–900 r/m
Range: 800 m
Mass: 8 kg

Users
: The MAG is in use in the Argentine Army as the 7,62 Ametralladora Tipo 60-20 MAG after being purchased in the 1960s. The MAG saw action during the Falklands War. Argentine MAGs were license-manufactured by the state-owned Dirección General de Fabricaciones Militares (DGFM) arsenal.

: The MAG is the standard GPMG of the Australian Defence Force, in particular the Australian Army, where it is known as the MAG 58. It is also used by the Australian Border Force.
: The MAG is used by the Austrian Army as the 7,62 mm MG FNMAG/Pz and is used in the Schützenpanzer Ulan and the Leopard 2A4. It's also used as the armament of the new S-70A-42 Black Hawk helicopters.

: Designated MAG M2 and MAG M3 for the coax version.

: Standard support weapon of the Brazilian Army, known as the M971. Used by the Coordenadoria de Recursos Especiais (from the Civil Police of Rio de Janeiro), the Federal Police and the Brazilian Marine Corps (Mod B60-20).

: The C6 was first used in Canada for use as a coaxial MG in the Leopard C1 main battle tank.  Since then, it has been used in the Canadian Forces with the designation the C6 GPMG, it is used primarily as a platoon level support weapon. One C6 machine gun is assigned to each Rifle platoon. The C6 GPMG is also mounted on a variety of vehicles, including the G-Wagon LUVW, LAV III, Coyote, Leopard C2, and CH-146 Griffon helicopter. In these vehicles, the C6 GPMGs are co-axially and pintle-mounted and used to provide fire support to the infantry or for local defence of the vehicle itself. Canada adopted a new version of C6 called C6A1 FLEX.
 

:Used by Special Force, designated as CS/LM1.

  Democratic Forces for the Liberation of Rwanda
: Used as armament in EH101.

: Made under license by the Maadi Company for Engineering Industries. Egyptian-made MAGs known as Helwan 920.
: The Swedish-made version known as the Ksp 58B has been adopted as the standard MG.
:100 machine guns came from the Netherlands with Leopard 2A6 MBTs in 2015-2019 
: Selected in 2010. 500 machine guns were purchased in 2011, and an additional 10,000 machine guns will eventually be supplied.

: M240L variant in use.

                                           
 : Used by the Royal Hong Kong Regiment.
: Manufactured by the Ordnance Factories Board under license.                                                                                                                
: Standard general-purpose machine gun of Indonesian Armed Forces. Also used by Komando Pasukan Katak (Kopaska) tactical diver group and Komando Pasukan Khusus (Kopassus) special forces group. M240 (M240C/D) variants used as coaxial & pintle mounted gun on Leopard 2 Main Battle Tank. FN MAGs made under license as the SM2, previously known as SPM2 GPMG by PT Pindad.

: Used by the Irish Defence Forces.

: Used by the Israel Defense Forces alongside IMI Negev and Negev NG7. Closed muzzle was adopted in Armored Forces to prevent muzzle flash.
: Battalion-level fire support weapon of the Jamaica Defence Force.
: M240C coaxial variant mounted on the AAV7 amphibious vehicle used by the JGSDF Amphibious Rapid Deployment Brigade.

: The Swedish-made version known as the Ksp 58B has been adopted by the Latvian National Guard as the standard MG.
: Adopted as standard MG by the Lebanese Armed Forces.
 
 
: Lithuanian Armed Forces.

: Compagnie des Carabiniers du Prince.
: MAG-60-20 Infanterie T1.
: Used by the Royal Navy, Marine Corps, Royal Air Force and Royal Army. The designation used by the Marine Corps is Mitrailleur van 7,62 mm NATO MAG FN whereas the Army designates the weapon as Mitrailleur 7.62 mm MAG. These legacy MAGs were replaced by newer models, featuring rails and polymer furniture.
: The New Zealand Defence Force originally purchased the British-made L7A2 version of the MAG in 1976. These are now being replaced by several versions of the Belgian-made MAG-58, which was originally introduced into service as part of the introduction of the NZLAV. The FN-made MAGs are now used in the infantry light machine gun (LMG) role as a flexible mounted machine gun on the LOV and NH90 and as a heavy sustained fire machine gun.
: Adopted by the Guardia Nacional de Nicaragua in the 1970s as standard MG.

 On Leopard 2A4 MBTs bought from the Netherlands. Supposed to replace the Rheinmetall MG3 in Norwegian service.

: Likely acquired from Australian stocks.
 : M240s were provided by the Joint United States Military Assistance Group – Philippines (JUSMAG-P) in 2021.
 : M240C tank variant were used on the M1A2 Abrams Main Battle Tank, other M240 variants were also purchased.
: Used by Portuguese Army on Pandur II IFV and Leopard 2A6 tank and by the Portuguese Navy on the Karel Doorman-class frigates.

: Sierra Leone Army used ex-British L7A2 GPMG. Some were captured by rebels.
: In use by Singapore Armed Forces and Police Coast Guard. Licensed production carried out by Ordnance Development and Engineering Company of Singapore, now integrated to ST Engineering. Two versions produced, one infantry assault variant fitted with a bi-pod, the other co-axial model for armored vehicle or vehicle mountings. One MAG is issued to each rifle platoon. It is always referred to as GPMG or simply MG. ST Engineering manufacture it as the 7.62 General Purpose Machine Gun.

: Used by the Spanish Army Airmobile Force and the Spanish Marine Infantry.

: Used by the Swedish Armed Forces, license made in Sweden and designated as the Ksp 58 (short for "Kulspruta", Swedish for "Machine gun" of model 1958).

: produced locally as T74 GPMG.
: Used by the Royal Thai Army, designated as the Type 38 General-purpose machine gun (ปก.38) in 1995.

  
 : unspecified number received during the Russian invasion in 2022.

: Used by the U.S. Military, designated as the M240.

See also
FN Minimi—FN MAG scaled down to 5.56 NATO
Mk 48 machine gun—FN Minimi in 7.62×51mm NATO for United States Special Operations Command (USSOCOM)
FN EVOLYS—Lightweight weapon
IWI Negev and Negev-NG7—Israel weapon 
Type 67 machine gun, QJY-88, QJS-161 and QJY-201—Chinese weapon
Sumitomo NTK-62—an outwardly similar Japanese weapon
Heckler & Koch MG5—A German derivative designed for French and German armed forces new general purpose machine gun trials
PKM and PKP Pecheneg machine gun—Russian squad automatic weapons
Vektor SS-77—A South African weapon designed as replacement for the FN-MAG

References

Citations

Bibliography

External links

FN Herstal official site
Modern Firearms
Video of the Canadian C6 GPMG
C6 tracer fire
Canadians exercise with the C6
Video of the L7A2 GPMG in British service
 

7.62×51mm NATO machine guns
Infantry weapons of the Cold War
MAG
General-purpose machine guns
Machine guns of Belgium
Weapons and ammunition introduced in 1958